Crinis was a Stoic philosopher.  It is not certain when he lived, although a line in the Discourses of Epictetus suggests that he lived at, or later than, the time of Archedemus (2nd century BC), and that he died from fright:
Go away now and read Archedemus; then if a mouse should leap down and make a noise, you are a dead man. For such a death awaits you as it did - what was the man's name? - Crinis; and he too was proud, because he understood Archedemus.

He was interested in Logic, and wrote a book called Dialectic Art,, from which Diogenes Laërtius quotes:
An argument, as Crinis says, is that which is composed of a lemma or major premise, an assumption or minor premise, and a conclusion; as for instance this,
"If it is day, it is light;"
"But it is day, therefore it is light."
For the lemma, or major premise, is, "If it is day, it is light."
The assumption, or minor premise, is, "It is day."
The conclusion follows, "Therefore it is light."

Notes

Hellenistic-era philosophers
Stoic philosophers
2nd-century BC philosophers